Rebel was the first solo album of John Miles. It was his most successful album, and contained the singles "Highfly" and "Music".

History
When Miles signed to Decca, they introduced him to producer Alan Parsons in the summer of 1975 (Miles would later sing on several tracks on several albums of the Alan Parsons Project). The first song they recorded was the song "Highfly" and it was released as a single, eventually reaching #17 in the U.K., #68 on the U.S. Billboard Hot 100 and #74 in Canada.

Because of the success of the single, plans were made to record a full album and recording of the album took place in November–December 1975 at Abbey Road Studios. The song "Music" was released, became an instant hit (reaching number 3 in the UK, number 88 in the United States) and is one of his most memorable songs.  The album reached the lower level of the U.S. Billboard 200 albums chart, peaking at #171.

The album title was based on the album cover on which he posed with a big gun on his shoulders, reminiscent of James Dean who is considered a rebel.
According to Miles, "Music" was  written in half an hour and was originally meant to be a basis for other songs, but because of its distinctive character, it was developed as a complete song.

Track listing

Personnel
 John Miles - lead vocals, keyboards, guitar, synthesizer
 Bob Marshall - bass
 Barry Black - drums, percussion
 Andrew Powell - orchestral arrangements

Charts

References

1976 debut albums
John Miles (musician) albums
Albums produced by Alan Parsons
Decca Records albums
London Records albums